The Polish Biographical Dictionary is a compact English–language dictionary of Polish biography, authored by Stanley S. Sokol and published by Bolchazy-Carducci Publishers in 1992. It features nearly 900 biographies of important Poles since Duke Mieszko I in the 10th century.

See also
 List of Poles
 List of Polish Americans
 Polish nobility
 Polish people
Polski Słownik Biograficzny (in English, "Polish Biographical Dictionary"), a multi-volume Polish-language dictionary of biography
 Who's Who directories

References

1992 non-fiction books
Polish biographical dictionaries